Colegio Nacional de Ushuaia (National College of Ushuaia) is a college preparatory school sponsored by the prestigious Colegio Nacional de Buenos Aires in Argentina. Both provide a free, rigorous, multi-disciplinary education that includes classical languages. The Colegio Nacional de Ushuaia was established in March 1994, as a response for the demand emerging from the growing population in Tierra del Fuego.

References

In Spanish. Liliana Vaccaro (2011) "Reencuentro de hermanos en el aula y en la vida en Ushuaia". In: Asociación de Ex Alumnos del Colegio Nacional de Buenos Aires. Revista La Campanita nº 34 (agosto 2011). p. 21. http://issuu.com/aexcnba/docs/lacampanita34

External links
CNU
CNBA

Ushuaia, Colegio Nacional
Educational institutions established in 1994
Ushuaia
Education in Tierra del Fuego Province, Argentina
1994 establishments in Argentina